The 1999–2000 season was the 98th in the history of the Western Football League.

The league champions for the fifth time in their history (and the second season running) were Taunton Town, but runners-up Mangotsfield United took promotion to the Southern League. The champions of Division One were Devizes Town after they finished the season unbeaten.

Final tables

Premier Division
The Premier Division was reduced from 20 clubs to 19 after Tiverton Town were promoted to the Southern League, and Calne Town and Keynsham Town were relegated to the First Division. Two clubs joined:

Dawlish Town, runners-up in the First Division.
Minehead Town, champions of the First Division.

First Division
The First Division was reduced from 19 clubs to 17 after Dawlish Town and Minehead Town were promoted to the Premier Division, and Glastonbury and Heavitree United left the league. Two clubs joined:

Calne Town, relegated from the Premier Division.
Keynsham Town, relegated from the Premier Division.

References

1999-2000
9